Keblov is a municipality and village in Benešov District in the Central Bohemian Region of the Czech Republic. It has about 200 inhabitants.

Administrative parts

The village of Sedlice is an administrative part of Keblov.

Geography
It lies in the Vlašim Uplands. The municipal territory is situated on the shores of Švihov and Němčice reservoirs.

History
The first written mention of Keblov is from 1290, when it was a property of the Prague bishops. In 1436, it was acquired by the Trčka of Lípa noble family. After they sold the village in 1547, its owners changed frequently. In the 17th century, the village of Sedlice was annexed to Keblov. In 1703, Keblov was bought by Count John Leopold of Trautson and Falkenstein, who annexed the village to the Křivsoudov estate.

Sights
The landmark of Keblov is the parish Church of the Assumption of the Virgin Mary. The Gothic church is as old as the village. It was destroyed by a fire in 1895 and rebuilt in 1897.

References

External links

Villages in Benešov District